Kentucky Kingdom, formerly known as Six Flags Kentucky Kingdom, is an amusement park in Louisville, Kentucky, United States. The  park includes a collection of amusement rides and the Hurricane Bay water park. Kentucky Kingdom is located at the intersection of Interstate 65 and Interstate 264, sharing a parking lot with the Kentucky Exposition Center.

In 1977, the Kentucky State Fair Board announced plans to build a theme park on the grounds of the Kentucky Fair and Exposition Center. The park's construction, overseen by Kentucky Entertainment Limited, began in 1986 and cost $12 million in total. Kentucky Kingdom opened to the public on May 23, 1987. The park went bankrupt after one season, and was reopened in 1990 by businessman Ed Hart. Due to the park's success, Kentucky Kingdom was sold to Six Flags in 1998 who operated the park until 2009. Five years after Kentucky Kingdom closed, Ed Hart reopened the park on May 24, 2014. Seven years after Kentucky Kingdom reopened, the park's operating rights were sold to Herschend Family Entertainment. Kentucky Kingdom is owned by the Kentucky State Fair Board, and operated by Herschend Family Entertainment.

Kentucky Kingdom has six roller coasters: Kentucky Flyer, Lightning Run, Roller Skater, Storm Chaser, T3, and Thunder Run. The park has opened many first-of-its-kind roller coasters. T3 was the first Vekoma Suspended Looping Coaster in North America. Lightning Run is the only Chance Rides Hyper GT-X Coaster in the world. Storm Chaser was the first roller coaster in the United States to feature a barrel roll drop.

History

Foundation (1977–87)

Planning and construction

The Kentucky State Fair Board released a long-range master plan for the redevelopment and expansion of the Kentucky Fair and Exposition Center grounds on March 24, 1977, which included the construction of a theme park. The Fair Board suggested that the park should be divided into three sections: a turn-of-the-century village, a Daniel Boone town and a "unit devoted to Kentucky's mining industry." A few years later, the fair board began looking for a developer who could operate the planned park, and on November 21, 1985, signed a contract with Kentucky Entertainment Limited, headed by Dallas businessman Michael Jenkins.

On December 13, 1985, at a press conference attended by Kentucky governor Martha Layne Collins and Louisville mayor Jerry Abramson, Kentucky Entertainment Limited and the Fair Board announced plans for Kentucky Kingdom, a 13-acre theme park focused on Kentucky's history and culture that would open in 1987. Construction began on March 28, 1986, with a team of mules and a 60-year old plow breaking the first ground at a ceremony that was also attended by Governor Collins and Mayor Abramson. On May 16, 1987, more than 6,000 Girl Scouts and their relatives were allowed to preview the park a week before opening. Most of the reviews were negative, as visitors complained about long lines and poor crowd control, many believed that the park was too small to accommodate large crowds.

The park opens
Kentucky Kingdom opened on May 23, 1987, with about 400 people in attendance at the opening ceremony. The park had four themed areas called "Carousel Plaza," "Old Louisville," "Kentucky Frontier," and "The Enchanted Forest." The latter was a children's area which would later become "King Louie's Playland." Many people who visited Kentucky Kingdom complained about the 13-acre park's small size and how it had few attractions, one visitor said "What few rides Kentucky Kingdom did have seemed to be oriented to younger children. In fact, most of the park seemed to be oriented to children. But what about the parents who take them there? What do they ride or do while waiting for their kids?" The park closed and filed for bankruptcy after only one season due to low attendance numbers, which were contributed to the small amount of attractions and poor weather conditions throughout the 1987 season. Most of the contractors and vendors were unpaid and almost all of the rides were auctioned off to other parks on April 15, 1989.

Rapid growth (1989–97)

The rights to operate Kentucky Kingdom were purchased by Ed Hart and a group of investors in April 1989. Hart was a local businessman who had renovated two buildings in Louisville's Highlands neighborhood. After Kentucky Kingdom closed, he was contacted by the Bank of Canada, who wanted him to reopen the park. Hart initially declined, because of the stories of Kentucky Kingdom's failure, but later changed his mind. Hart's first step was paying the 227 vendors and contractors that were unpaid before. On December 15, 1989, the new operators decided to exercise an option in their deal with the Fair Board to lease an additional 13 acres so that the park could be expanded.

Kentucky Kingdom reopened for the 1990 season on June 13, with an estimated 2,000 people visiting the park on the first day of the season. While all the rides from the 1987 season were sold, the Starchaser indoor roller coaster had remained on-site at the amusement park allowing Hart to purchase it back. Additionally, new rides were added including Bluebeard's Bounty, The Enterprise, Whirling Dervish (later renamed Breakdance), and The Vampire roller coaster. The Tin Lizzies antique car ride reused the same track as the former car ride, Pontiac's Tin Lizzy Junction, while new antique cars were added in 1995 which were formerly used at Opryland USA in Tennessee. In 1991, the park opened the Flying Dutchman, a wooden shoe-swing ride that was relocated from Kings Island.

In late 1990, Kentucky Kingdom announced plans to build a water park that was projected to open in either the summer of 1991 or April 1992. In the next year, the park revealed more details about the planned water park, including that it would be 6-acres, named Ocean Avenue, it would open in 1992, and have a separate admission cost of $4 to $6. In 1991 The Quake, which was the first Vekoma Waikki Wave to open in North America, opened. It was announced in October of the same year that all profits from the 1991 season would be invested into the water park's development. The name was later changed to Ocean Paradise, however the name was changed for a third time to Hurricane Bay, which was the planned name for the water park's wave pool. Hurricane Bay opened in 1992, as a water park with no separate admission fee from Kentucky Kingdom. Other additions in 1992 included a $2.6 million, 150-foot-tall Ferris wheel called the Giant Wheel. The following year a new slide complex opened in Hurricane Bay featuring four different slides. In 1994, the park opened Mile High Falls, the then world's tallest shoot-the-chute water ride. The children's roller coaster Roller Skater was also added that year.

T2: Terror to the Second Power opened to the general public in April 1995. The ride is a Vekoma Suspended Looping Coaster, the coaster is 101-feet tall, 2,172 feet long, has five inversions, and a top speed of 49 mph. T2 was the first of its kind on the continent and the second only in the world, with the other being Condor at Walibi Holland in the Netherlands. That same year, Hellevator, a 177-foot-tall Intamin drop tower opened in October, just in time for the park's annual Halloween event, Halloscream. In 1996, the upcharge attraction, Top Eliminator Dragsters opened.

The park made its most expensive investment yet with the addition of Chang in 1997, a $12 million stand up Bolliger & Mabillard coaster that set the world records for stand up coasters in height, drop, length, speed, and number of inversions. Thrill Karts (also known as Kingdom Go Carts) were also added this year, but were an upcharge attraction. Through the 1990–1998 seasons the park was considered as the fastest growing amusement park in North America. Park attendance had increased from 130,000 guests during the 1990 season, to 1.2 million guests during the 1997 season.

Six Flags era (1998–2010)

Kentucky Kingdom announced on September 26, 1997, that the rights to operate the park would be sold to Premier Parks for $64 million; the deal was finalized on November 7. As part of the agreement, Premier Parks agreed to continue bringing new attractions to the park through at least 1999. At the time, Kentucky Kingdom was one of the main tourism attractions for Louisville, receiving more visitors than Churchill Downs. On April 1, 1998, Premier Parks purchased Six Flags from Time Warner, and as such, on June 21, 1998, Kentucky Kingdom became known as Six Flags Kentucky Kingdom. Also on June 21, 1998, Twisted Sisters, a wooden dueling roller coaster, officially opened to the public. The roller coaster cost $5 million, and had been planned by Thememparks LLC, who originally wanted to name it "Double Trouble." Hook's Lagoon, an interactive tree house with water activities, was also added that year to Hurricane Bay. Six Flags then transformed King Louie's Playground into Looney Tunes Movie Town and added the Batman Stunt Show Spectacular in 1999. It became the ninth amusement park to use the Six Flags name.

The Penguin's Blizzard River opened in 1999, using many pumps and mechanisms for a rapids ride that Premier Parks who had previously purchased the parts from Opryland USA. The parts were from Grizzly River Rampage, a rapids ride, that closed along with Opryland in 1997. That same year, the Vampire roller coaster was removed due to several malfunctions that had occurred earlier in the season. The ride would later reopen as Flashback at Six Flags New England in 2000. The park opened Road Runner Express, a wild mouse coaster, in 2000, and opened Skycoaster one year later. The Twisted Sisters roller coaster was renamed to Twisted Twins in 2002, upon the threat of a lawsuit from the band Twisted Sister. Kentucky Kingdom opened Greezed Lightin' in the following year, a shuttle loop roller coaster formerly located at Six Flags Over Georgia as Viper and before that as Tidal Wave at Six Flags Great America. It was named after another shuttle loop coaster in the chain at the now defunct Six Flags AstroWorld in Houston, Texas. The Quake was removed in 2004 because of malfunctions and was replaced by the Tornado water attraction in 2005. In 2007, Hurricane Bay was renamed to Six Flags Splashwater Kingdom and Deluge, the first hydromagnetic water coaster, along with Buccaneer Beach, a water play area for young children. Also, the Hellevator drop tower was renamed and rethemed to Superman: Tower of Power just in time for opening day 2007.

On June 21, 2007, an accident occurred on the Superman: Tower of Power drop tower which resulted in a 13-year-old girl having both feet amputated at the ankles after a cable fracture occurred on the ride. This accident caused several other drop towers to close down, including Drop Tower: Scream Zone at Cedar Fair parks. On November 29, 2007, it was announced that Superman: Tower of Power would not reopen for the 2008 season. The ride was removed in 2008, the park originally was to replace the ride with a new attraction for the 2008 season, but this never occurred. Instead, Mega Wedgie, a new water slide, was added to Splashwater Kingdom in 2008. Due to major debt by owner Six Flags, the entire northwest section of the park, which included Twisted Twins, Mile High Falls, and the Zeppelin spinning blimp ride, was completely closed for the remainder of Six Flags' operation of the park.

On September 21, 2009, Kentucky Kingdom confirmed that Chang was being removed for the addition of Bonzai Beach, a new water park region with a separate theme from the existing Splashwater Kingdom. Bonzai Beach would have opened in the 2011 season to coincide with Six Flags' 50th anniversary that year.

Amid a corporate bankruptcy, on February 4, 2010, Six Flags announced the park would cease operations immediately due to the rejection of an amended lease by the Kentucky State Fair Board. This left the fair board and Six Flags to negotiate the ownership of rides and attractions. On July 25, 2010, this dispute was settled with Six Flags receiving a ride of their choice (Road Runner Express), and $2.8 million in lease-related payments owed by Six Flags was forgiven in exchange for Six Flags' property rights (which included the offices, furniture, fixtures and equipment relating to the park, and all intellectual property). The Kentucky State Fair Board also used $2.35 million from Ed Hart to purchase Six Flags'  stake in the park. Six Flags removed all of the Looney Tunes and DC Comics/Batman related content from the park along with inner tubes, overhead shades from rides, and some parts from rides to use at its other parks. Six Flags also removed the Sky Coaster, as they had leased the ride and the owner had decided to take the ride elsewhere. Greezed Lightnin' remained at the park until July 2013 when Ed Hart and Themeparks, LLC removed it due to it refurbishing costs exceeding the ride value.

Attempts to revive the park (2010–12)
Ed Hart, along with several other investors formed the Kentucky Kingdom Redevelopment Company in May 2010. Their aim was to reopen the park by Memorial Day Weekend the year after funding and their plans were approved. After 16 months trying to get funding approved, the Kentucky Kingdom Redevelopment Company announced on September 30, 2011, that the fair board had ended negotiations and that their company would no longer take part in reopening the park. On November 4, Ed Hart sued the state of Kentucky in an attempt to recoup $1.4 million that he claimed had been spent as part of the failed effort to reopen the amusement park.

On January 16, 2012, the owners of Holiday World & Splashin' Safari in Santa Claus, Indiana, announced they were involved in talks about the future of Kentucky Kingdom. Their media release stated they were in a fact-finding stage and hadn't made any decisions about whether to move forward in pursuing an opportunity to run the theme park. On February 7, four members of the Koch family, who also own Holiday World & Splashin' Safari, formed a new company, Bluegrass Boardwalk, Incorporated, to negotiate a lease agreement with the Kentucky State Fair Board and to apply for economic development incentives from the Commonwealth of Kentucky. On February 23, the Kentucky Fair Board approved a lease agreement for the former Kentucky Kingdom property to the Koch family. It was announced that Kentucky Kingdom would be renamed Bluegrass Boardwalk, would reopen on May 11, 2013, and employ 25 full-time and 800 seasonal workers.

Later that month the plans for the park's reopening began to unravel. On May 30, it was confirmed that the park would not reopen in 2013. On June 15, it was announced that the Koch family would not reopen the park at all, with Bluegrass Boardwalk CEO Natalie Koch stating: "many layers of governmental regulations and stipulations ultimately caused them to withdraw." Afterwards, former operator Ed Hart, before his return several months later, criticized the Koch family for using Kentucky Kingdom as an opportunity to help Holiday World continue to thrive without nearby competition to possibly harm its business. The Kochs, however, later disputed these comments.

Ed Hart's return (2012–21)
Ed Hart and the Kentucky Kingdom Redevelopment Company announced in August 2012 that they would begin work to reopen the park in 2014. On October 19, Hart said the company planned to invest $120 million, using $50 million to reopen the park and investing another $70 million over the term of the lease. All rides were slated to reopen with the exception of Greezed Lightnin', which was too costly to repair and reopen. The company also planned to add a $15 million roller coaster, install three new rides, and double the size of the Hurricane Bay water park. The planned expansion would be the largest in the park's history.

In January 2013, the Kentucky Fair Board granted preliminary approval for a lease and the Kentucky Tourism Development Finance Authority (KTDFA) approved government incentives in support of reopening the park, placing Ed Hart and his investors in charge of park operations. The scheduled opening date was announced as May 24, 2014. On March 25, Hart specified that it would take more money than previously anticipated to rebuild and expand the park. The investment plan previously approved under the terms of the lease consisted of $20 million in partner equity and $25 million in borrowed money. The city planned to provide subsidies and tax incentives up to $200,000 per year for the first five years and $100,000 per year for following five years. Hart was able to secure $28.5 million in financing and proprietors would be under contract obligation to invest at least $1 million per year on park upgrades. On April 10, the KTDFA approved up to $10 million in sales tax rebates over the next 10 years for Kentucky Kingdom.

Construction began in July 2013. The park added a new $7 million, Chance Rides roller coaster, named Lightning Run, three new children's rides in King Louie's Playland (previously Looney Tunes Movie Town), a new drop tower named FearFall (a replacement for the park's former drop ride, Superman: Tower of Power), a new flat ride named Professor John's Flying Machines, and several new attractions in the Hurricane Bay Water Park. Kentucky Kingdom and Hurricane Bay reopened on May 24, 2014.

The reopening was a success. After the first month, Kentucky Kingdom sold over 100,000 season passes, and by the end of the season, the park attracted 600,000 visitors. Kentucky Kingdom announced plans to open a renovated amphitheater and roller coaster T3 (formerly known as T2) in 2015. On September 25, 2014, Cyclos and Skycatcher were announced for 2015, along with three refurbished attractions: Enterprise, Raging Rapids River Ride, and T3. On January 16, 2015, Kentucky Kingdom announced the park would add three other rides, calling the total group of eight new rides the Kingdom Eight. Added were Up Up and Away, Flutterfly and The Wizard of Oz.

On July 20, 2015, Kentucky Kingdom officials announced that the park would be adding their fifth roller coaster, Storm Chaser, for the 2016 season. Storm Chaser is a Rocky Mountain Construction roller coaster which used part of Twisted Twins' existing structure, which has sat standing but not operating since the end of the 2007 season. Storm Chaser opened to the public on April 30, 2016.

For the 2017 season Kentucky Kingdom announced Eye of the Storm, a high-speed flat ride with a seven-story loop, continuous rotations and inversions, and forward and backward motions. Thunder Run, meanwhile, received a new train as well as modifications to its track at a cost of about $500,000. The train replaced the original Thunder Run train first put into service in 1990 and provided a smoother and faster ride. Other planned upgrades to the park included the installation of more shade at Hurricane Bay water park and ride waiting lines throughout the park, additional locker room space and upgraded air conditioning in the park's restroom and dining areas. There was also more tables, chairs and benches and smoother, quicker season pass process processing and in-person purchases through technology improvements. Additional improvements consisted of more ticket windows, a new entrance to Hurricane Bay and more children's rides.

The park had a record 2017 season drawing more than 9,000 visitors a day during the summer peak. For the 2018 season, Scream Xtreme (a Zamperla Endeavour) replaced the Enterprise. Rock'n'Roller, a small Himalaya-style family ride was also added. A double feature for 5D Cinema (Happy Family & Journey 2: The Mysterious Island) was added, along with more cabanas for the wave pool, improved infrastructure such as new shade and additional seating installation.

To celebrate the park's 5th anniversary upon its grand reopening in 2014, the Kentucky Flyer family wooden coaster was added for the 2019 season. Kentucky Flyer is manufactured by The Gravity Group from Cincinnati, Ohio, and takes riders of all ages through 1,288 feet of airtime hills and twists at a maximum speed of 35 mph. The coaster's construction was almost cancelled in late 2018, when on October 16, the Kentucky State Fair Board wouldn't allow the park to use half an acre of 20-acre expansion land, which was promised in the park's lease. The Fair Board claimed that they weren't able to allow the park to use the land, because expansion of the park involved talks with several landlord parties; Hart claimed that construction was halted due to an ongoing lawsuit that the park filed against the Fair Board because of parking issues. The next day, Kentucky Kingdom was granted permission to use the land, and the roller coaster's construction continued.

On June 24, 2019, Hart announced that HalloScream, a Halloween-themed event that was held at the park in the 1990s, would return in October 2019, to celebrate Kentucky Kingdom's 30th anniversary. In a statement, Hart said: "Since reopening Kentucky Kingdom in 2014, we've had many, many requests for the return of HalloScream. We thought our 30th anniversary would be the perfect time to bring it back." Kentucky Kingdom had not held a Halloween-themed event at the park in ten years. The park employed a Louisville-based company, Oak Island Creative to produce HalloScream. The event lasted from October 3 to October 27.

On April 20, 2020, Kentucky Kingdom announced that the park would open for the 2020 season in early June instead of opening in late April, as originally scheduled. This change was made to help prevent the further spread of COVID-19. It was also announced that when the park would open in June, they would extend Kentucky Kingdom's operating hours to 10:00 AM to 9:00 PM daily and that Hurricane Bay would remain open until 8:00 PM daily. Governor Andy Beshear addressed the park's plan to reopen in early June on April 28, saying: "In a normal operation like that, that is a ton of people who are together and around one another. So we're going to have to take a very close look at that." During the governor's daily press briefing on May 20, Beshear said that he did not want to be the first governor to open an amusement park, which made many people believe that Kentucky Kingdom would not open until at least July. On May 29, Kentucky Kingdom announced that the park would reopen on June 29 with new safety protocols and reduced admission prices. On June 9, Kentucky Kingdom announced that Hurricane Bay would open on July 3, with the same safety guidelines as the amusement park. Hurricane Bay's opening date was later moved to June 29, with limited attractions.

Herschend Family Entertainment (2021–present)
On February 22, 2021, two state boards signed off on approvals to sell Kentucky Kingdom to an "unnamed national operator of nine amusement or theme parks." The buyer's address in Georgia was linked to Herschend Family Entertainment, an entertainment company which operates three theme parks. During a press conference the following day, attended by governor Andy Beshear, Louisville mayor Greg Fischer, and Ed Hart, it was formally announced that Herschend Family Entertainment would become the new majority partner and operator of Kentucky Kingdom. Craig Ross, the longtime former president of Dollywood, was appointed as Kentucky Kingdom's general manager.

List of attractions

Roller coasters

Family rides

Thrill rides

Water rides

King Louie's Playland

Hurricane Bay

Incidents

Two major incidents occurred at the park that resulted in injury. The rides involved in the incidents were Starchaser (in 1994) and Superman: Tower of Power (in 2007).

Starchaser
On July 26, 1994, two cars collided on the Starchaser roller coaster after a ride operator allowed them to go through the ride too close together. The accident resulted in the hospitalization of Mary Noonan, a 7-year-old girl, who had serious injuries, including a lacerated liver. Lisa Kiava, a reporter for WHAS-TV, falsely claimed that the ride had malfunctioned and that unnamed state inspectors had pronounced the indoor roller coaster unsafe. WHAS-TV reported on the accident in throughout July 1994 and again in May 1996, which led to Ed Hart suing the station for its reporting on the accident, claiming that they were responsible for a profit-loss of $800,000. In March 1998, the jury ruled in favor of Kentucky Kingdom, awarding the park $3.975 million. The case was appealed many times after the 1998 ruling, until June 2006, when the station abandoned the appeals process and gave Themeparks LLC $7.4 million.

Superman: Tower of Power

On June 21, 2007, a 13-year-old girl was severely injured on Superman: Tower of Power. A cable, which snapped shortly after the ride began, became entangled around the girl's feet during the drop, shattering her left femur and severing both feet. Her right foot was successfully reattached later, but amputation below the knee was required on the left leg. Following the incident, other drop tower rides around the country were temporarily grounded for inspection. Superman: Tower of Power at Kentucky Kingdom, however, never reopened and was dismantled.

Kentucky Kingdom Gardens
Kentucky Kingdom Gardens, the park's horticulture department, has a year-round greenhouse that grows more than 20 cultivars of annuals, more than 100 different species of perennials and ornamental grasses, and various specimen coniferous and deciduous trees. In 2016, the park introduced plant labels, which provided the plant names, and a QR code that would give more information about the plants. The department is currently headed by Jason Anderson, and has more than 12 staff members.

Parking
Kentucky Kingdom shares a parking lot with the Kentucky Exposition Center; parking costs $10 for cars and $20 for buses. When the park reopened in 2014, season pass holders had to pay to park. However, on April 2, 2015, Kentucky Kingdom and the Kentucky State Fair Board made a ten-year agreement for the park to pay the Fair Board $400,000 annually, to allow season pass holders to park for free, except for during the Kentucky State Fair. On July 11, 2018, the park filed a lawsuit against four state agencies, including the Kentucky State Fair Board, claiming that the Fair Board violated the deal to give free parking to season pass holders. Kentucky Kingdom claimed that state departments, including the Fair Board, restricted parking for park patrons by granting “exclusive” use to the Kentucky State Fair midway operator and other tenants of the exposition center. The lawsuit resulted in a settlement in July 2019, which resulted in the park only opening on two days during the State Fair, all park visitors were now required to enter the parking lot through gate two, and season pass holders would not be charged for parking.

Restaurants and catering

Kentucky Kingdom has a total of 30 restaurants and food stands across the park. Season pass holders are given a 20% discount on all food purchases. On March 30, 2006, Six Flags and Papa John's Pizza formed a multi-year marketing alliance, which led to Papa John's Pizza opening various restaurants in the park. Kentucky Kingdom prepares more than 50,000 catered meals every season, and up to 5,000 meals per day.

See also
Herschend Family Entertainment, Kentucky Kingdom's operator from 2021 to present
Themeparks LLC, Kentucky Kingdom's operator from 1990 to 1997 and 2014 to 2020
Six Flags, Kentucky Kingdom's operator from 1998 to 2009
List of attractions and events in the Louisville metropolitan area

References

External links

Official Website

 
Tourist attractions in Louisville, Kentucky
Amusement parks in Kentucky
1987 establishments in Kentucky
Amusement parks opened in 1987
Kentucky State Fair